The uniforms and insignia of the Sturmabteilung (SA) were Nazi Party paramilitary ranks and uniforms used by SA stormtroopers from 1921 until the fall of Nazi Germany in 1945. The titles and phrases used by the SA were the basis for paramilitary titles used by several other Nazi paramilitary groups, among them the Schutzstaffel (SS). Early SS ranks were identical to the SA, since the SS was originally considered a sub-organization of the Sturmabteilung.

Origins of SA titles (1921–1923)

The brown shirted stormtroopers of the Sturmabteilung gradually come into being within the Nazi Party beginning in 1920. By this time, Adolf Hitler had assumed the title of Führer of the Nazi Party, replacing Anton Drexler who had been known as the more democratically elected Party Chairman. Hitler began to fashion the Nazi Party on fascist paramilitary lines and, to that end, the early Nazis of the 1920s would typically wear some sort of paramilitary uniform at party meetings and rallies. The most common of these were World War I uniforms with full medals. Also common were uniforms of the Freikorps as well as uniforms of veteran groups such as Der Stahlhelm. Nazi Party members would also mix components from all three types of uniforms with little to no standardization except a swastika armband worn on the left arm.

By 1921, the Nazi Party had taken its "Sports Detachment", consisting mostly of bodyguards Hitler used for his own protection, and had formed the Nazi stormtroopers, or the "Storm Detachment", which was shortened to be known as the SA. It was at this point that the very first SA titles came into being, although there were no established uniforms or insignia except a swastika armband worn on a paramilitary uniform. At the start of the group's existence, the SA had four primary titles:
 Oberster SA-Führer (Supreme SA-Leader)
 SA-Oberführer (SA-Senior Leader)
 SA-Führer (SA-Leader)
 SA-Mann (SA-Trooper)

In 1923, the SA was disbanded after the failed Munich Beer Hall Putsch. The group was refounded two years later in 1925.

Early SA rank insignia (1924–1929)
From 1923 to 1925, the SA did not officially exist since Adolf Hitler had been imprisoned for his actions in the Munich Putsch and the Nazi Party banned in Germany. Underground cells of SA men did continue to meet in secret, including one run by an SA leader named Gerhard Roßbach. It was Roßbach who effectively invented the "Nazi brownshirt" uniform since, during Roßbach's Austrian exile in 1924, a large store of military surplus brown denim shirts intended for tropical uniforms in East Africa, which were originally bought in 1921, was taken over by the Schill Youth in Germany. The "Schill Sportversand" then became the main supplier for the SA brown shirts.

In 1925, the SA was re-founded as part of the new Nazi Party which Hitler had put together following his release from prison. The reborn SA then received its first formal uniform regulations and also began using the first recognizable system of rank insignia.

Along with a brown shirt uniform, SA members would wear swastika armbands with a kepi cap. Originally, the SA used its pre-1923 rank titles, but this changed in 1926 when local SA units began to be grouped into larger regiment sized formations known as Standarten. Each SA regiment was commanded by a senior SA officer called a Standartenführer. At the same time, to differentiate from the SA rank and file, senior SA officers began to wear oak leaves on their collars to signify their authority. Under this system, a Standartenführer wore one oak leaf, an Oberführer two oak leaves, and the Supreme SA Commander wore three. The lower ranks of SA-Führer and SA-Mann still wore no insignia.

[[File:SA Kragenabzeichen rechts (Sturm 12, Standarte 93).jpg|thumb|115px|right|An SA unit insignia patch; here: 'Sturm 12 / Standarte 93.]]

In 1927, the officer rank of SA-Führer became known by the title of Sturmführer and a higher officer rank known as Sturmbannführer was created to be held by battalion formation commanders directly subordinate to the Standartenführer. In 1928, an expansion of SA enlisted ranks was required in response to the growing rank and file membership of the SA troopers. These new titles and ranks were denoted by an insignia system which consisted of silver pips pinned to a wearer's collar. The pip system was adopted from the Stahlhelm veteran's group which was closely connected to the SA both in dual membership and ideological design.

A further change in 1928 was the creation of the rank of Gruppenführer. This rank used the three leaf collar insignia previously reserved for the Supreme SA Commander and the rank was held by the senior most SA commanders in Germany who led division sized formations of several SA-Standarten. By this time, the SA had also begun to use unit insignia for its junior members which consisted of a numbered collar patch, showing both battalion and regiment affiliation, worn opposite the badge of rank. This unit insignia patch was worn by those holding the rank of Sturmbannführer and below; the higher officer ranks wore oak leaf insignia on both collars.

By the close of the 1920s, the SA rank system had solidified into the following titles:

SA uniforms under Ernst Röhm (1930–1933)

The next major change in SA uniforms and insignia occurred in 1930 when Ernst Röhm was appointed as Chief of Staff of the SA. Röhm's appointment was as the result of Adolf Hitler personally assuming command of the SA as the Oberster SA-Führer. Hitler would hold this title until the fall of Nazi Germany in 1945 and, after 1930, it was the SA Chief of Staff who was the effective leader of the organization.

Röhm undertook several changes to the SA uniform and insignia design, the first being to invent several new ranks in order for the SA rank system to mirror that of the professional military. The rank expansion took place gradually between 1930 and 1932, with the final addition being the creation of a rank of SA-Obergruppenführer, which Röhm appointed to himself as well as senior SA-generals of the SA command staff. The new ranks used the same collar pip and oak leaf system as before, but with the addition of corded shoulder boards worn on the right shoulder for the officers. Further, the officers wore right shoulder cord of either gold or silver. In contrast, the enlisted men wore piping cords shaped as shoulder straps on the right shoulder.

In 1933, when Adolf Hitler became Chancellor of Germany, Röhm made his title of SA-Chief of Staff into an actual rank. The insignia for Ernst Röhm's new rank (known as Stabschef) consisted of a wreathed star which was designed after that of a Bolivian General, due to Röhm's previous military experience as a military adviser in Bolivia.

Ranks and insignia
This table contains the final ranks and insignia of the SA, which were in use from 1942 to 1945.

 Remarks
Right  collar patch contains the number and type of unit (ascending up to "Obersturmbannführer"  in SA and SS, and "Oberstaffelfuehrer"  in NSMC): ... Left collar patch contain the rank insignias (from ascending "Standartenfuehrer" both sides).

Waffenfarben

Prior to 1932, when the Schutzstaffel wore the same uniform as the SA, black uniform colors also indicated membership in the SS; however, SS men wore all-black kepis and neckties, and (from 1929) black breeches and boots.

It was also during the 1930s that the SA began using uniform colors to denote an SA member's Gruppe (Division) to which the SA member belonged. The unit color was worn on the front of the kepi cap as well as rank and unit collar patches. The marking system - patches/kepi color combined with gold or silver buttons/pips - would eventually expand to cover these SA divisions; as of 1937:

  Crimson and Gold: SA Chief of Staff
  Carmine and Silver: SA Supreme Command and Standarte Feldherrnhalle
  Crimson and Silver: SA Group Staff
  Dark Maroon and Gold: Ostland Group (East Prussia and Free City of Danzig)
  Dark Maroon and Silver: Westfalen Group (Westphalia and Lippe)
  Black and Gold: Niederrhein Group (northern part of Rhine Province)
  Black and Silver: Berlin-Brandenburg Group (Berlin and western part of Brandenburg)
  Pink and Gold: Ostmark Group (Eastern part of Brandenburg)
  Apple Green and Gold: Pommern Group
  Apple Green and Silver: Thüringen Group
  Dark Brown and Gold: Westmark Group (parts of Rhine Province and Saar territory)
  Dark Brown and Silver: Niedersachsen Group (eastern part of Province of Hanover and Brunswick)
  Emerald and Gold: Sachsen Group
  Emerald and Silver: Nordmark Group (greater part of Schleswig-Holstein)
  Yellow Orange and Gold: Mitte Group (Province of Saxony and Anhalt)
  Yellow Orange and Silver: Südwest Group (Württemberg and greater part of Baden)
  Sulphur Yellow and Gold: Franken Group (parts of Northern and Western Bavaria)
  Sulphur Yellow and Silver: Schlesien Group
  Light Blue and Gold: Bayerische Ostmark Group (parts of Eastern and Northern Bavaria)
  Light Blue and Silver: Hochland Group (parts of Southern and Western Bavaria)
  Steel Green and Gold: Nordsee Group (Western part of Province of Hanover, Oldenburg and Bremen)
  Steel Green and Silver: Kurpfalz Group (including parts of Hesse and Baden)
  Navy Blue and Gold: Hansa Group (Hamburg, Mecklenburg, southern part of Schleswig-Holstein)
  Navy Blue and Silver: Hessen Group (Hesse-Nassau and parts of Hesse)

Final pattern SA uniforms (1934–1945)

A slight alteration to the rank and insignia system of the SA occurred in July 1934 after the Night of the Long Knives. Victor Lutze did away with Röhm's special insignia for the rank of Stabschef and instead adopted a collar patch in much the same design as that of Reichsführer-SS, a rank which Heinrich Himmler now held.

Special uniforms
Even before the fall of Ernst Röhm, the SA had adopted a more formal appearance to its uniforms in an effort to make the group appear as an actual military formation rather than a group of street fighters. To this end, the SA had created a formal "office" type uniform which consisted of a brown coat worn over the basic brown shirt uniform.

Special uniforms also existed for corps of the SA, such as the motorized SA, the SA Alpine troops, and the SA-Marine, considered an auxiliary of the Kriegsmarine. It was the SA-Marine that expanded its uniforms almost to a level unto themselves, with special nautical insignia which no other unit of the SA displayed.

Gallery

See also
Nazi party paramilitary ranks
Ranks and insignia of the Nazi Party
Ranks and insignia of the Schutzstaffel
Ranks and insignia of the National Socialist Motor Corps
Ranks and insignia of the Reichsluftschutzbund
Ranks and Insignia of the German Army in World War II
Comparative military ranks of World War II
Corps colours of the Sturmabteilung

References

Bibliography

 
 Bedurftig, Friedemann, and Zenter, Christian. The Encyclopedia of the Third Reich. 1985.
 
Hayes, A. SS Uniforms, Insignia and Accoutrements''. Schiffer Publishing, Ltd. 2000. 
 

Sturmabteilung
 
SA